The Jardin de la vallée du Maelbeek (French) or Maalbeekdaltuin  (Dutch) is a small green space on the corner of the Rue de la Loi/Wetstraat and the / at the heart of the European Quarter of Brussels, Belgium. It was inaugurated on 13 May 1951.

The park is testimony to the local residents' struggle against the rapid urbanisation (also known as Brusselisation) in the quarter that lacked urban planning and new green spaces. The site was originally destined to be used for a new headquarters for the Council of the European Union (which eventually moved into the Justus Lipsius building across the road) but in the face of unanimous opposition the Belgian Government tried to sell, what was then a temporary car park, it to property developers before it was converted into a local park.

A miniature river in the park reflects the Maelbeek river which once flowed through the area, but is now channelled through an underground collector.

See also

 List of parks and gardens in Brussels

References

Notes

Parks in Brussels
Urban public parks
City of Brussels
European quarter of Brussels
1951 establishments in Belgium
Protected areas established in 1951